Jaane Kya Baat Hui ( "Don't Know What Happened") is an Indian television series which premiered on Colors on 1 December 2008. It replaced the reality show Bigg Boss which ended on 22 November 2008. The series was produced by Prem Krishen of Cinevistaas Limited and starred Shweta Tiwari and Sanjeet Bedi in the leads.

Plot
The story takes off after 10 years of Aradhna's marriage to Shailendra Sareen. Everybody loves her, except for Brinda, Bharat's wife. Brinda wants her status in the family to strengthened and to also have a part of the property of her share; (for her children Sagar and Simran) The show deals with the extramarital affairs of Shailendra-; And him never loving/finding time to spend with Aradhna. Sameera, a girl who worked with Shailendra as his new secretary, and he continuously started to have a secret affair with her, even while Aradhna was working with him in the office. Unfortunately Aradhna witnessed one of the moments with Sameera and Shailendra and totally broke up. Finally, in greed, Shailendra agrees to always maintain his relationship with Aradhna and not betray her by making relationships with women that he employs. Unfortunately, one day an evil woman named Raveena decides to dupe Shailendra into her charms and turn him against Aradhna to gain his full trust to gain his property and business.  Shailendra, who was blindfolded by Raveena, lent her money to buy a flat of her own (because at the time she was staying in a hotel), and she lied to Shailendra that she had financial problems. Meanwhile, Shantanu (the Sareens' family friend), and Chandar (Shailendra's elder brother), plotted many plans to eliminate Raveena from Shailendra's life. A few of these plans were not successful. 
Unfortunately Sanjana and Vrinda was also sided with Raveena just for the money and their side of the property. They never managed to realise the importance of Aradhna in the Sareen house, therefore never learnt their lesson.

In the end Aradhna achieves her goal (to get Shailendra out of Raveena's clutches), and Shailendra is sorry for his unacceptable actions. Aradhna does not forgive Shailendra fully, but instead says that if he was treated in the same way that she was, how would he feel, and the serial ended on a puzzling note.

Cast

Main cast
 Shweta Tiwari as Aradhana Sareen 
 Sanjeet Bedi as Shailendra Sareen

Recurring cast
 Rupal Patel as Vrinda Bharat Sareen
 Rajendra Chawla as Bharat Sareen
 Shishir Sharma as Jawahar Sareen
 Abhinav Kohli as Akshay Sareen
 Ami Trivedi as Sanjana Akshay Sareen
 Abhinav Shukla as Shantanu Agnihotri
 Tapeshwari Sharma as Simran Sareen
 Aparna Kumar as Raveena Anand
 Lucky Raajput as Inspector Khan
Vimal 
Sundar C

References

External links 
 Jaane Kya Baat Hui Official Website

Colors TV original programming
Indian drama television series
2008 Indian television series debuts
2009 Indian television series endings